Disneyremixmania is the first remix album in the Disneymania series. It comprises fourteen songs from the past three volumes remixed to create dance versions of Disney songs. Additionally, the "Disneyremixmania Mega Mix" contains three Disneymania 3 songs mashed into a medley by DJ Skribble. The album peaked at #146 on the Billboard 200, making it the lowest charting album in the series until Princess Disneymania which peaked at #191 on the Billboard 200. Also, it was the first album in the series to not be certified Gold. It has sold about 50,000 copies in the US which is the second lowest for a Disneymania album, ahead of only Princess Disneymania, which has sold only 9,000 copies in the US.

Track listing

Chart positions

Weekly charts

Year-end charts

Singles
"Under the Sea (Reggae Mix)" Raven-Symoné

Videos
"DJ Skribble Megamix"- Raven-Symoné, The Cheetah Girls, Lalaine
"Under the Sea" - Raven-Symoné

References

External links
 Disneymania Official site

Disneymania albums
2005 remix albums
Walt Disney Records remix albums